Son of the Dragon is a Big Finish Productions audio drama based on the long-running British science fiction television series Doctor Who.  It involves Vlad III the Impaler, also known as 'Dracula'.

Plot
The year is 1462 and the Doctor, Peri and Erimem encounter Vlad the Impaler.

Cast
The Doctor — Peter Davison
Peri — Nicola Bryant
Erimem — Caroline Morris
Dracula — James Purefoy
Radu — Douglas Hodge
John Dobrin  — Barry McCarthy
Maria — Clare Calbraith
Soldiers — Steven Wickham
Ayfer — Nicola Lloyd

Continuity
 The Doctor's mention of meeting actual vampires is either a reference to the Fourth Doctor in State of Decay or the Fifth Doctor in the novel Goth Opera.

External links
Big Finish Productions – Son of the Dragon
    

2007 audio plays
Fifth Doctor audio plays
Works by Steve Lyons
Cultural depictions of Vlad the Impaler